Guo Xingyuan (born 20 October 1988) is a Chinese para table tennis player. He has won one gold medal and two silver medals from three Paralympic Games (2008, 2012, and 2016).

Like many of his teammates, Guo was a polio survivor from Pizhou who attended New Hope Center as a child. That's where coach Heng Xin developed him into a star.

References

1988 births
Living people
Table tennis players at the 2016 Summer Paralympics
Table tennis players at the 2012 Summer Paralympics
Table tennis players at the 2008 Summer Paralympics
Paralympic medalists in table tennis
Medalists at the 2016 Summer Paralympics
Medalists at the 2012 Summer Paralympics
Medalists at the 2008 Summer Paralympics
Chinese male table tennis players
Paralympic gold medalists for China
Paralympic silver medalists for China
Paralympic table tennis players of China
People with polio
Para table tennis players from Pizhou
Table tennis players at the 2020 Summer Paralympics
21st-century Chinese people